Colin D. Rea (born July 1, 1990) is an American professional baseball pitcher in the Milwaukee Brewers organization. He previously played in Major League Baseball (MLB) for the San Diego Padres, Miami Marlins, and Chicago Cubs and Milwaukee Brewers.

Career

Amateur
After graduating from Cascade High School in Cascade, Iowa, Rea played college baseball at the University of Northern Iowa before transferring to St. Petersburg College and then Indiana State University. In 2010, he played collegiate summer baseball with the Hyannis Harbor Hawks of the Cape Cod Baseball League.

San Diego Padres

Rea was selected by the San Diego Padres in the 12th round of the 2011 Major League Baseball draft. He signed with the Padres and made his professional debut in 2011 with the Low-A Eugene Emeralds, posting a 3-4 record and 2.21 ERA in 15 games. In 2012, Rea played for the Single-A Fort Wayne TinCaps, pitching to a 5-10 record and 4.11 ERA with 80 strikeouts in 103.0 innings of work.. In 2013, Rea split the year between Fort Wayne and the Advanced Single-A Lake Elsinore Storm, logging a cumulative 2-6 record and 4.08 ERA. He returned to Lake Elsinore for the 2014 season, recording an 11-9 record and 3.88 ERA with 118 strikeouts in 139.0 innings pitched.

In 2015, Rea began the season with the Double-A San Antonio Missions, and logged a 1.08 ERA in 12 games with the team. On August 11, 2015, Rea was selected to the 40-man roster and promoted to the major leagues for the first time. Rea made his major league debut that day, pitching 5.0 innings of 3-run ball against the Cincinnati Reds. Rea made 1 appearances with the Triple-A El Paso Chihuahuas in 2016, allowing 1 run in an inning of work.

Miami Marlins
Rea was involved in a pair of transactions between the Padres and Marlins just before the MLB trade deadline on August 1, 2016. He was first traded along with Andrew Cashner and Tayron Guerrero to the Miami Marlins in exchange for Jarred Cosart, Carter Capps, Josh Naylor, and Luis Castillo on July 29. He then made his Marlins debut in an 11–0 win over the St. Louis Cardinals at Marlins Park the following night on July 30, but an injury ended his start after one out in the fourth inning. His right elbow strain landed him on the 15-day disabled list on July 31.

San Diego Padres (second stint)
Rea's four-day odyssey ended on August 1 when he and Castillo were returned to their original teams. NBC Miami reported that the Marlins felt they had been sent an injured player in Rea from the Padres. On August 5, 2016, Rea was diagnosed with a torn ulnar collateral ligament of the elbow. After visiting Dr. James Andrews, Rea opted for a platelet rich plasma injection, but it was unsuccessful. In November, Rea underwent Tommy John surgery, and was declared to miss all of the 2017 season. In 2018, Rea returned to the organization and logged a 3-5 record and 5.73 ERA in 18 games between El Paso and San Antonio. On November 20, 2018, Rea was designated for assignment by the Padres, and released six days later.

Chicago Cubs
On January 7, 2019, Rea signed a minor league contract with the Chicago Cubs organization. Rea was named 2019 Pacific Coast League Pitcher of the Year after a successful season with the Triple-A Iowa Cubs, with whom he posted a 14-4 record and 3.95 ERA in 26 appearances. The Cubs selected his contract to the 40-man roster on November 4, 2019.

The Cubs recalled Rea to the Major Leagues on July 30, 2020. In 9 appearances for Chicago in 2020, Rea recorded a 5.79 ERA with 10 strikeouts in 14.0 innings of work. Rea was expected to be a part of the Cubs bullpen in 2021, but was released by the organization on January 4, 2021 so he could pursue an opportunity in Japan.

Fukuoka SoftBank Hawks
On January 7, 2021, Rea signed with the Fukuoka SoftBank Hawks of the Nippon Professional Baseball (NPB). On June 3, he made his debut at NPB as a starter in the Interleague play against the Yokohama DeNA BayStars. His wife gave birth in late July, making it difficult for him to leave his family and return to Japan. The Hawks acknowledged his desire to prioritize his family and he decided to leave the team on August 8.

Milwaukee Brewers
On August 14, 2021,  Rea signed a minor league contract with the Milwaukee Brewers. He was assigned to the Triple-A Nashville Sounds. On September 29, Rea was selected to the 40-man roster.
Rea made 1 appearance for the Brewers, pitching 6 innings, giving up 5 runs and striking out 5. He became a free agent following the season.

Fukuoka SoftBank Hawks (second stint)
On December 19, 2021, Rea signed a contract to return to the Fukuoka SoftBank Hawks in Nippon Professional Baseball.

In 2022, Rea finished the regular season with 23 appearances, a 5–6 Win–loss record, 3.96 ERA, one hold, and 80 strikeouts in 100.0 innings of work. He became a free agent following the 2022 season.

Milwaukee Brewers (second stint)
On January 27, 2023, Rea signed a minor league contract with the Milwaukee Brewers organization.

References

External links

 Indiana State Sycamores bio
 Northern Iowa Panthers bio
 Career statistics - NPB.jp
 26 Colin D. Rea PLAYERS2022 - Fukuoka SoftBank Hawks Official site
 

1990 births
Living people
American expatriate baseball players in Japan
Baseball players from Iowa
Chicago Cubs players
El Paso Chihuahuas players
Eugene Emeralds players
Fort Wayne TinCaps players
Fukuoka SoftBank Hawks players
Hyannis Harbor Hawks players
Indiana State Sycamores baseball players
Iowa Cubs players
Lake Elsinore Storm players
Major League Baseball pitchers
Miami Marlins players
Milwaukee Brewers players
Nashville Sounds players
Northern Iowa Panthers baseball players
Nippon Professional Baseball pitchers
People from Cascade, Iowa
San Antonio Missions players
San Diego Padres players
St. Petersburg Titans baseball players